Nawiady  is a village in the administrative district of Gmina Piecki, within Mrągowo County, Warmian-Masurian Voivodeship, in northern Poland.

On May 1, 1981 the local Protestant church was charged and forcefully taken over by Catholics.

References

Nawiady